Óscar Rubén Fernández Romero (born 28 September 1974) is a Spanish football manager, currently in charge of UD Almería B.

Coaching career
Born in Torrefiel, Valencia, Fernández graduated from the University of Valencia and started his career at Tavernes Blanques CF before moving to CF Torre Levante's youth categories. In 2005, he was appointed manager of Burjassot CF in Tercera División.

Fernández moved to Valencia CF in 2006, being named manager of the Juvenil squad. In July of the following year, he was appointed at the helm of the reserves in the fourth division, and on 29 October 2007, after Quique Sánchez Flores was sacked from the main squad, he was appointed interim. His first professional match occurred two days later, a 1–5 loss against Real Madrid.

Fernández managed the Che for one further match, a 2-0 away defeat of RCD Mallorca, and subsequently returned to the B-team after the appointment of Ronald Koeman. He left the club in 2010, and spent a year without work before being appointed at newly formed side Huracán Valencia CF in June 2011.

On 16 June 2011, Fernández announced his departure from Huracán, after having accepted an offer from Superleague Greece side Asteras Tripoli FC. In September, however, after only three matches, he was sacked.

On 24 October 2011, Fernández returned to Spain and was presented as manager of fourth division side CF Gandía. On 20 September of the following year, he moved to Qatar to work for Aspire Academy, being manager of the national under-17 team.

On 10 July 2015, Fernández was appointed manager of Atlético Madrid's Juvenil A squad. Roughly one year later he took over the B-team, achieving promotion to Segunda División B in 2017 and reaching the third division play-offs in 2019.

On 15 June 2019, Fernández was named UD Almería manager in Segunda División, replacing departing Fran Fernández. On 3 August, however, after the club's change of owner, he reached an agreement to terminate his contract.

On 4 August 2020, Fernández returned Valencia and its reserve team, with the side now in the third division. He left the club the following 17 June, and returned to Almería four days later, now named manager of the B-team in Tercera División RFEF.

Managerial statistics

References

External links
 
 

1974 births
Living people
Sportspeople from Valencia
Spanish football managers
La Liga managers
Segunda División B managers
Valencia CF managers
Huracán Valencia CF managers
Atlético Madrid B managers
UD Almería managers
UD Almería B managers
Super League Greece managers
Asteras Tripolis F.C. managers
Spanish expatriate football managers
Spanish expatriate sportspeople in Greece
Spanish expatriate sportspeople in Qatar
Expatriate football managers in Greece
Expatriate football managers in Qatar
CF Gandía managers
Valencia CF non-playing staff
Valencia CF Mestalla managers
University of Valencia alumni